Schoodic Lake is a deep Maine lake with a small drainage basin. The lake covers much of the western half of Lake View Plantation. Tributaries drain Orson Bog, Norton Pond, and Jaquith Pond in eastern Brownville. The lake provides good habitat for togue, squaretail, and land-locked Atlantic salmon. Fishermen also find smallmouth bass, white sucker and round whitefish.

Sources

Lakes of Piscataquis County, Maine
Lakes of Maine